The Australian Ladies Classic Bonville is a golf tournament co-sanctioned by Australian Ladies Professional Golf Tour and the Ladies European Tour first played in 2018. It is played at the Bonville Golf Resort in Bonville, New South Wales, Australia.

Winners

References

External links

Coverage on the Australian Ladies Professional Golf's official site
Coverage on the Ladies European Tour's official site

ALPG Tour events
Ladies European Tour events
Golf tournaments in Australia
Recurring sporting events established in 2018
Summer events in Australia